Sarumathi "Saru"  Jayaraman (born April 3, 1975) is an American attorney, author, and activist from Los Angeles, California. She is an advocate for fair wages for restaurant workers and other service workers in the United States.  In the aftermath of September 11th, she co-founded the non-profit public service organization Restaurant Opportunities Centers United. And in 2013 she founded a new organization to work on these issues, called One Fair Wage.  Jayaraman is a recipient of the Ashoka fellowship in 2013 and the Soros Equality Fellowship in 2020.

Early life 
Born in 1975, Jayaraman was raised in a primarily Chican neighborhood in Whittier, California. Her parents emigrated from India to the United States when her father was seeking work as a software engineer. They settled in the Los Angeles area, but Jayaraman's father lost his job when she was a teenager. She was made aware of her class and race at a young age. Her family frequently endured racial slurs and insults. One incident from her childhood occurred when many mechanics refused to service her family's car when it broke down while they were road tripping across Utah.

Higher education 
Jayaraman was accepted to Harvard at the age of sixteen, but her parents wanted her to stay close to home . Sixteen-year-old Jayaraman attended UCLA instead, where she earned her B.A. in International Development Studies and Political Science and graduated summa cum laude in 1995. She continued her education at Yale Law School and Harvard Kennedy School of Government. In 2000, Jayaraman was admitted to the State Bars in California and New York. During her time at Yale, Jayaraman studied under MacArthur Foundation Fellowship winner, Jennifer Gordon. Jayaraman was hired at Gordon's organization, the Workplace Project, where she dealt with training and organizing mistreated Latino immigrant workers to become their own advocates in instances of labor abuse.

ROC United 

After September 11, 2001, thousands of workers from the World Trade Center were left jobless. The restaurant at the top of the World Trade was named Windows on the World. Jayaraman worked in partnership with Fekkak Mamdouh, the former chief server of Windows, to represent the displaced workers. The organization Jayaraman and Mamdouh founded together was named the Restaurant Opportunities Center of New York. Although it was originally established to help those affected by 9/11, the ROC evolved and became an organizing center for all immigrant restaurant workers in New York and eventually nationwide. Jayaraman headed the expansion effort and became the co-founder and director of Restaurant Opportunities Center United in 2007. ROC United, currently has over 18,000 members across 15 states. The organization deals with workplace justice campaigns, establishing living wages, and protecting workers rights. Jayaraman has been a key player in major advancements for low wage workers across the country. ROC United has won back more than $10 million for its members, and Jayaraman is continuing the fight for fair wages and working conditions through a newer organization, ONE FAIR WAGE. There are two federal minimum wages in the United States: $7.25 for untipped workers, and $2.13 for tipped workers, as of 2021. Jayaraman spearheads the  One Fair Wage campaign which seeks to eliminate this two tier system.  Seven states have already ended the subminimum wage and enacted One Fair Wage legislation:California, Oregon, Washington,  Nevada, Montana, Minnesota and Alaska. There, all workers earn a full fair minimum wage with tips on top.  In early 2020 as restaurants were shuttering during the Covid-19 pandemic, Jayaraman launched the One Fair Wage Emergency Fund, raising $22 million to grant to out of work service workers.  Later in 2020, the new Biden-Harris presidential administration announced its support for ending the subminimum wage and increasing the federal minimum wage to $15 an hour, and these policies were introduced in the Raise the Wage Act in early 2021, still pending action in Congress. ROC United was also instrumental in the passing of Washington's Accrued Sick and Safe Leave Act, which assures that all workers can begin accumulating sick leave after one day on the job.

Professional life and other activism  
In 1992, Saru Jayaraman started a non-profit called Women and Youth Supporting Each Other (W.Y.S.E) which "empowers young women by providing the resources and support necessary to make positive life choices and create community change." She was recognized by President Bill Clinton during his commencement speech and was praised as "America at its best." Jayaraman worked as a professor at various colleges in the New York area, teaching classes on a variety of topics, including political science, sociology, immigrants rights, and law. She also conducted research on food workers, sustainability, and urban poverty. Jayaraman has been serving as the leader of the Food Labor Research Center at the University of California, Berkeley since 2012. It is the first academic institution to study the relationship between food and labor.

Personal life 
Jayaraman is married to Zachary Norris, and has two daughters. Jayaraman and Norris met at a Rebelling Lawyers Conference. Norris is now the executive director of the Ella Baker Center for Human Rights in San Francisco.

Works 
Saru Jayaraman has written four books. The New Urban Immigrant Workforce, released in 2005, is about modern methods of labor organizing. It draws on first-hand accounts and ethnographies from workers in New York. Behind the Kitchen Door: The People Who Make and Serve Your Food was written in 2013. The book is about sexism, racism, and worker abuse in restaurants. Forked: A New Standard for American Dining was published in 2016. The book investigates the employment practices of a wide range of restaurants, from fine dining establishments to fast-food chains. Jayaraman’s forthcoming book, One Fair Wage: Ending Subminimum Pay in America will be published by The New Press in the Fall of 2021

Jayaraman is a frequent guest on  television programs including on PBS, CNN, MSNBC, and HBO's Real Time with Bill Maher. Jayaraman has also published numerous journal articles and technical reports.

Controversy 
In 2007, a group of former employees brought a lawsuit against Jayaraman and the Restaurant Opportunities Center. Following the tragic attacks of September 11, 2001, Jayaraman set out to open Colors, an employee-owned restaurant for the former workers from Windows on the World that was destroyed in the attacks. However, the feel-good project faced controversy when some of the worker-owners sued to keep all the ownership of the restaurant for themselves and not other workers in the organization. In the lawsuit, Jayaraman is also accused of expelling workers for voicing their objections. 

In 2012, the Restaurant Opportunities Center had an oversight investigation opened on it by the United States House of Representatives calling into question the groups federal funding. In 2019, Jayaraman left ROC to found One Fair Wage.  After Jayaraman left, ROC closed Colors restaurant in New York City.

Awards and honors 

Jayaraman was named SF Chronicle Visionary Of The Year in 2019 and listed in CNN's Top10 Visionary Women. She was named a Champion of Change by the Obama administration in 2014, and was awarded a James Beard Foundation Leadership Award in 2015. She was named one of Crain's New York Business "40 Under 40," 1010 Wins' "Newsmaker of the Year," and New York Magazine's "Influentials" of New York City." In 2018 she was chosen by the National Women's History Project as one of its honorees for Women's History Month in the United States.

Other accolades: 
 Prime Movers Award. Boston, 2011-2013
 Wolfe Fellowship in the Humanities. Brooklyn College. New York, 2009-2010
 1010 WINS "Newsmaker of the Year." New York, 2009
 Crain's New York Business "40 Under 40." New York, 2008
 Honoree, New York Committee on Occupational Safety & Health. New York, 2007
 Honoree, Workshop in Business Opportunity. New York, 2007
  Named one of the 11 Most Influential People in Food, New York Magazine's "Influentials" Issue. New York, 2007
 Immigrant Leadership Award for New York City, Mayor Bloomberg. New York, 2006
 Profiled as a New York Times "Public Life." New York, 2005
 Union Square Award winner. New York, 2003
 Harvard Foundation "Road to Success" honoree. Cambridge, 2002
 Schell Fellowship, Yale Law School. New Haven, 2000
 Dean's Award for Excellence in Student Teaching, Harvard University. Cambridge, 1998
 Annual Service Award, Harvard University John F. Kennedy School of Government. Cambridge, 1997
   Mary McCarthy Fellowship, Yale Law School. New Haven, 1996
 Outstanding Senior Award, Chancellor's Service Award, University of California at Los Angeles. Los Angeles, 1995.
 Fellow, Harry S. Truman National Fellowship. St. Louis, 1994

Other 
She attended the 75th Golden Globe Awards in 2018 as a guest of Amy Poehler.

References 

1976 births
Living people
Harvard Kennedy School alumni
People from Whittier, California
Trade unionists from California
American people of Indian descent
Yale Law School alumni
University of California, Los Angeles alumni
Ashoka USA Fellows
Ashoka Fellows